Group B of the 2005 Fed Cup Europe/Africa Zone Group III was one of four pools in the Europe/Africa Zone Group III of the 2005 Fed Cup. Three teams competed in a round robin competition, with the top team and the bottom two teams proceeding to their respective sections of the play-offs: the top team will play for advancement to Group II.

Botswana vs. Iceland

Algeria vs. Botswana

Algeria vs. Iceland

See also
Fed Cup structure

References

External links
 Fed Cup website

2005 Fed Cup Europe/Africa Zone